Dirty Face or Dirtyface may refer to:

Dirty Face Creek, a stream in Iowa
Dirtyface Peak, a mountain in Washington